ECBE may refer to:

 Essex County Board of Education
 European Council for Business Education